Mamed Suleyman oglu İbragimov (born 21 March 1946, in Baku, Azerbaijan SSR) is a former Soviet wrestler.

References

1946 births
Living people
Sportspeople from Baku
Soviet male sport wrestlers
Azerbaijani male sport wrestlers
European Wrestling Championships medalists